In order theory and model theory, branches of mathematics, Cantor's isomorphism theorem states that every two countable dense unbounded linear orders are order-isomorphic. For instance, Minkowski's question-mark function produces an isomorphism (a one-to-one order-preserving correspondence) between the numerical ordering of the rational numbers and the numerical ordering of the dyadic rationals.

The theorem is named after Georg Cantor, who used it to characterize the (uncountable) ordering on the real numbers. It can be proved by a back-and-forth method that is also sometimes attributed to Cantor. The same back-and-forth method also proves that countable dense unbounded orders are highly symmetric, and can be applied to other kinds of structures. However, Cantor's original proof only used the "going forth" half of this method. In terms of model theory, the isomorphism theorem can be expressed by saying that the first-order theory of unbounded dense linear orders is countably categorical, meaning that it has only one countable model, up to logical equivalence.

One application of Cantor's isomorphism theorem involves temporal logic, a method for using logic to reason about time. In this application, the theorem implies that it is sufficient to use intervals of rational numbers to model intervals of time: using irrational numbers for this purpose will not lead to any increase in logical power.

Statement and examples

Cantor's isomorphism theorem is stated using the following concepts:
A linear order or total order is defined by a set of elements and a comparison operation that gives an ordering to each pair of distinct elements and obeys the transitive law. The familiar numeric orderings on the integers, rational numbers, and real numbers are all examples of linear orders.
Unboundedness means that the ordering has no minimum or maximum element. All three of these examples are unbounded. The subset of real or rational numbers in the open unit interval (0,1) is similarly unbounded, but the closed unit interval [0,1] is not: it has a minimum element, 0, and a maximum element, 1.
An ordering is dense when every pair of elements has another element between them. This is true for the rational numbers and real numbers, where the arithmetic mean of any two numbers belongs to the same set and lies between them, but not for the integers. For instance, there is no other integer between 0 and 1, so the integers are not 
The integers and rational numbers both form countable sets, but the real numbers do not, by a different result of Cantor, his proof that the real numbers are uncountable.
Two linear orders are order-isomorphic when there exists a one-to-one correspondence between them that preserves their ordering. For instance, the integers and the even numbers are order-isomorphic, under a bijection that multiplies each integer by two.
With these definitions in hand, Cantor's isomorphism theorem states that every two unbounded countable dense linear orders are 

Within the rational numbers, certain subsets are also countable, unbounded, and dense. The rational numbers in the open unit interval are an example. Another example is the set of dyadic rational numbers, the numbers that can be expressed as a fraction with an integer numerator and a power of two as the denominator. By Cantor's isomorphism theorem, the dyadic rational numbers are order-isomorphic to the whole set of rational numbers. In this example, an explicit order isomorphism is provided by Minkowski's question-mark function. Another example of a countable unbounded dense linear order is given by the set of real algebraic numbers, the real roots of polynomials with integer coefficients. In this case, they are a superset of the rational numbers, but are again  It is also possible to apply the theorem to other linear orders whose elements are not defined as numbers.

Proofs
One proof of Cantor's isomorphism theorem, in some sources called "the standard  uses the back-and-forth method. This proof builds up an isomorphism between any two given orders, using a greedy algorithm, in an ordering given by a countable enumeration of the two orderings. It alternates between the two orders for which one it searches for the first missing element, and which one it uses to find a matching element. Every element of each ordering is eventually matched with an order-equivalent element of the other ordering, so the two orderings are 

Although the back-and-forth method has also been attributed to Cantor, Cantor's original publication of this theorem in 1895–1897 used a different  In an investigation of the history of this theorem by logician Charles L. Silver, the earliest instance of the back-and-forth proof found by Silver was in a 1914 textbook by 

This naturally finds an equivalence between the first ordering and a subset of the second ordering, and Cantor then argues that the entire second ordering is 

The back-and-forth proof has been mechanized in Coq, yielding a strengthened result that when two computably enumerable linear orders have a computable comparison predicate, and computable functions representing their density, and unboundedness properties, then the isomorphism between them is also

Model theory
One way of describing Cantor's isomorphism theorem uses the language of model theory. The first-order theory of unbounded dense linear orders consists of sentences in mathematical logic concerning variables that represent the elements of an order, with a binary relation used as the comparison operation of the ordering. These sentences include both axioms, formulating in logical terms the requirements of a dense linear order, and all other sentences that can be proven as logical consequences from those axioms. The axioms can be formulated logically using either a strict comparison  or a non-strict comparison  but the strict comparison simplifies the expression of the axioms for the properties of being unbounded and dense. The axioms of this system can be expressed 

A model of this theory is any system of elements and a comparison relation that obeys all of the axioms; it is a countable model when the system of elements forms a countable set. For instance, the usual comparison relation on the rational numbers is a countable model of this theory. Cantor's isomorphism theorem can be expressed by saying that the first-order theory of unbounded dense linear orders is countably categorical: it has only one countable model, up to logical 

Because it is countably categorical, the unique model of a categorical theory is a saturated model. This is a notion involving types, which, intuitively, describe the behavior of systems of elements from the model. A finite type is a system of logical formulas, with finitely many elements fixed as constants and finitely many free variables called parameters, for which every finite conjunction of the formulas is realizable by assigning elements of the model to its parameters. In a (countable) saturated model, every finite type is realizable: there is some way of assigning elements to the parameters that simultaneously satisfies all of the formulas in the type. In contrast, types with countably many constants can describe Dedekind cuts, and there are too many of these for the theory of dense unbounded linear orders to be a stable theory. This implies that this theory is not categorical for higher cardinalities: for any higher cardinality, there must be multiple inequivalent dense unbounded linear orders with the same 

A method of quantifier elimination in the first-order theory of unbounded dense linear orders can be used to prove that it is a complete theory, meaning that every logical sentence in the language of this theory is either a theorem or the negation of a theorem. This is closely related to being categorical (a sentence is a theorem if it is true of the unique countable model; see the Łoś–Vaught test) but there can exist multiple distinct models that have the same complete theory. In particular, both the ordering on the rational numbers and the ordering on the real numbers are models of the same theory, even though they are different models. Quantifier elimination can also be used in an algorithm for deciding whether a given sentence is a

Related results
The same back-and-forth method used to prove Cantor's isomorphism theorem also proves that countable dense linear orders are highly symmetric. Their symmetries are called order automorphisms, and consist of order-preserving bijections from the whole linear order to itself. By the back-and-forth method, every countable dense linear order has order automorphisms that map any set of  points to any other set of  points. This can also be proven directly for the ordering on the rationals, by constructing a piecewise linear order automorphism with breakpoints at the  given points. This equivalence of all  sets of points is summarized by saying that the group of symmetries of a countable dense linear order is "highly homogeneous". However, there is no order automorphism that maps an ordered pair of points to its reverse, so these symmetries do not form a 

The isomorphism theorem can be extended to systems of any finite or countable number of disjoint sets, sharing an unbounded linear ordering and each dense in each other. All such systems with the same number of sets are order-isomorphic, under any permutation of their sets.  give as an example the partition of the rational numbers into the dyadic rationals and their complement; these two sets are dense in each other, and their union has an order isomorphism to any other pair of unbounded linear orders that are countable and dense in each other. Unlike Cantor's isomorphism theorem, the proof needs the full back-and-forth argument, and not just the "going forth" 

Cantor used the isomorphism theorem to characterize the ordering of the real numbers, an uncountable set. Unlike the rational numbers, the real numbers are Dedekind-complete, meaning that every subset of the reals that has a finite upper bound has a real least upper bound. They contain the rational numbers, which are dense in the real numbers. By applying the isomorphism theorem, Cantor proved that whenever a linear ordering has the same properties of being Dedekind-complete and containing a countable dense unbounded subset, it must be order-isomorphic to the real  Suslin's problem asks whether orders having certain other properties of the order on the real numbers, including unboundedness, density, and the cardinality of the continuum, must be order-isomorphic to the reals; its truth is independent of Zermelo–Fraenkel set theory with the axiom of choice 

Another consequence of Cantor's proof is that every finite or countable linear order can be embedded into the rationals, or into any unbounded dense ordering. Calling this a "well known" result of Cantor, Wacław Sierpiński proved an analogous result for higher cardinality: assuming the continuum hypothesis, there exists a linear ordering of cardinality  into which all other linear orderings of cardinality  can be  Baumgartner's axiom concerns  sets of real numbers, unbounded sets with the property that every two elements are separated by exactly  other elements. It states that each two such sets are order-isomorphic, providing in this way another higher-cardinality analogue of Cantor's isomorphism theorem. It is consistent with ZFC and the negation of the continuum hypothesis, and implied by the  but independent of 

In temporal logic, various formalizations of the concept of an interval of time can be shown to be equivalent to defining an interval by a pair of distinct elements of a dense unbounded linear order. This connection implies that these theories are also countably categorical, and can be uniquely modeled by intervals of rational

References 

Model theory
Order theory